Robert Currie was a Scottish professional football forward, best remembered during his five years in the Football League with Bury. He also played in the Scottish League for Heart of Midlothian, Arthurlie and Morton.

Personal life 
Currie's brothers Duncan and Sam also became footballers.

Honours 
Heart of Midlothian
 North Eastern Cup: 1912–13

Career statistics

References 

Scottish footballers
Date of death missing
1884 births
Scottish Football League players
Kilwinning Rangers F.C. players
Heart of Midlothian F.C. players
Association football inside forwards
Middlesbrough F.C. players
Abercorn F.C. players
Greenock Morton F.C. players
Bury F.C. players
Darlington F.C. players
English Football League players
Arthurlie F.C. players
Galston F.C. players